The National Library of the Republic of Kazakhstan (NLRK) is the national library of Kazakhstan. It acquires free legal copies of books, Republic and regional information, district journals, newspapers and other printed productions issued in Kazakhstan. In 2009, architect Bjarke Ingels designed the new National Library of Kazakhstan, located to the south of the State Auditorium in Astana, which is said to resemble a "giant metallic doughnut".

History 
December 31, 1910, is considered to be the NLRK's birthday. On this day the Verny Municipal Duma decided to open the municipal library with the help of ardent supporters in Verny city. Verny was later renamed to Alma-Ata province. In 1931 it was renamed into State Public Library of Kazakhstan SSR. Since that time the library functions as the state national book storage in the republic. The first director was Uraz Djandosov. He considered the storage of 'all printed output in Kazakh and all literature about Kazakhstan' to be the most important task among the library activities. In 1937 the library was named after A.S. Pushkin.

In 1991 the library changed its name into the National Library of the Republic of Kazakhstan (the NLRK), and was given special state and public significance as a particularly valuable cultural object of the Republic. The NLRK collections include 5.5 million publications in 100 languages of the world. Researchers are attracted by the collection of rare books and manuscripts. These number about 25 thousand volumes in the Kazak, Russian, Oriental and Western European languages from the eleventh to the eighteenth and the first half of the nineteenth centuries.

In 2020, according to the decree of the President of the Republic of Kazakhstan Kasym Zhomart Tokayev "On assigning the status of "National" to some cultural organizations" from November 20, 2020, the National Library of the Republic of Kazakhstan was assigned the status "National". At the moment, the book fund of the National Library of the Republic of Kazakhstan has over 7 million books. The annual attendance of readers is over 1 million people, and the loan is about 2 million.

At the beginning of 2020, the Abai Literary Center was opened in the library, where loud readings of Abai's poems, literature reviews, and various events take place. Also, in order to facilitate familiarization and in-depth study of the scientific works of the thinker and the holding of events in the library. Al Farabi Scientific Center, dedicated to the 1150th anniversary of the great philosopher and thinker. The center is a permanent open access exhibition of al Farabi's works and publications about him.

Management 

 Dzhandosov O. K.
 Shmeleva E. Н.
 Dauletova N. K.
 Berdigalieva Roza Amangalievna (1987-2003)
 Murat Mukhtarovich Auezov (2003-2007)
 Isakhov Orynbasar (2007-2011).
 Balabekova Gulisa Kabarovna (2011-2014)
 Askar Alibek (2014-2016)
 Seidumanov Zhanat Turarovich (since 2016)
 Ospanova Bakytjamal Kairbekovna (since 2019)

Departments 
The library work is defined by its long-term programs: 'Memory of the People,' 'The Preservation and Conservation of Book and Manuscript Monuments,' 'The Republican Automated Library and Information System'. Annually the library acquires more than 36 thousand books, periodicals and machine- read documents. Constant supplements to collections with editions in Kazak is a main trend of the National Library work.

The NLRK pays great attention to the development of new links and support of traditional cultural connections with foreign countries. For many years the NLRK has maintained book exchanges with 200 CIS libraries and 80 cultural organizations from 40 countries. In this respect the Library of Congress, the Harvard University Library, countries such as India, Spain, Egypt, France, Great Britain, Norway, Austria, Germany, Iran, Turkey, China, Korea are our permanent partners. The NLRK is a member of the IFLA – International Federation of Library Associations.

As a result of the transfer of the capital from Almaty to Astana, the NLRK has created a branch based on the S. Seifullin Regional Universal Scientific Library. Within the library is located the headquarters of the Library Association of the Republic of Kazakhstan (LARK), created on the initiative of the NLRK.

References

External links 
 Official site
 Research Guide to the National Bibliography of Kazakhstan

Libraries established in 1910
Kazakhstan
Libraries in Kazakhstan
Government of Kazakhstan
Library
1910 establishments in the Russian Empire